Department of Primary Industries or Department of Primary Industry may refer to one of these government departments in Australia:


Federal
 Department of Primary Industry (1956–1974)
 Department of Primary Industry (1975–1987)
 Department of Primary Industries and Energy (1987–1988)

State
 Department of Agriculture and Fisheries (Queensland), formerly Department of Primary Industries 
 Department of Primary Industries (New South Wales)
 Department of Primary Industries and Regional Development (Western Australia)
 Primary Industries and Regions SA (South Australia)
 Department of Primary Industries and Water (Tasmania) 
 Department of Primary Industries (Victoria)

See also
 Department of Agriculture, Water and the Environment, the Australian federal department since 1 February 2020
 List of agriculture ministries (worldwide)
Ministry for Primary Industries (New Zealand)
 Ministry of Plantation Industries and Commodities (Malaysia), from 2018 to 2020 known as Ministry of Primary Industries